Bachelor Mother is a 1932 Pre-Code action film directed by Charles Hutchison.

Plot
A conniving young man is brought up on charges of reckless driving. To "prove" his innocence and good character, he goes to a nursing home and adopts an old woman whom he presents as his loving mother. Unfortunately for him, she really gets into her role and when he falls in love with a seductive, shady lady, the old lady does all she can to protect him from her; this includes getting him tossed in jail and shooting the young trollop. Afterward, the old lady must stand trial.

Cast
 Evalyn Knapp as Mary Somerset
 James Murray as Joe Bigelow
 Margaret Seddon as Cynthia Wilson
 Paul Page as Arthur Hall
 Astrid Allwyn as Lola Butler
 Harry Holman as Judge Yates
 Virginia Sale as Mrs. Stone

References

External links
 
 
 
 

1930s action films
American black-and-white films
American action films
Films directed by Charles Hutchison
1930s English-language films
1930s American films
English-language action films